Vaults was a British electronica band from London, United Kingdom, composed of Blythe Pepino, Barney Freeman, and Ben Vella. The band split in 2017.

History 
The band was founded in 2013, after Pepino was recruited to provide vocals on Freeman and Vella's musical project. Their first track as a group, "Cry No More", was posted to SoundCloud independently in 2013; it gathered 100,000 plays within its first week.

Their debut single, "Premonitions", was released in 2014 by independent record label National Anthem. They released their first EP, Vultures, later in the same year. After being signed to Virgin EMI in 2014, Vaults released debut major-label single "Lifespan", followed by "Vultures". During the summer of 2014, Vaults performed at the Lovebox, T in the Park, and Reading and Leeds festivals.

In 2015, they released single "One Last Night", which later appeared on the motion picture soundtrack for Fifty Shades of Grey. This was followed by a re-issue of "Cry No More". They released their second EP, also titled Cry No More, on 31 July 2015. Pepino appeared on Gorgon City single, "All Four Walls", in March 2016.

Vaults' single "Midnight River", released in July 2016, was named Single of the Week by The Guardian.

The London Evening Standard reported in April 2016 that Vaults' music videos had gathered a combined 20 million views without having released an album.

They also performed the music for the 2016 John Lewis Christmas advert, with a cover of Randy Crawford's "One Day I'll Fly Away".

The band collectively announced the decision to split on 25 May 2017 on their official Facebook page, citing the loss of a creative spark for the band.
 Pepino now performs with the band Mesadorm (originally founded in 2015), who released debut album, Heterogaster, on 11 May 2018, while Ben Vella formed the band Child of the Parish, with his brother Tom and the artist Pius Bak.

Personal lives 
In early 2016, Pepino was interviewed about her polyamorous relationship with boyfriend Tom Jacob by The Independent.

Discography

Studio albums

Extended plays

Singles

As lead artist

As featured artist

References 

2013 establishments in England
English synth-pop groups
Musical groups disestablished in 2017
Musical groups established in 2013
British musical trios